NHS Education for Scotland (NES) is an education and training body and a special health board within NHS Scotland.

NES is the national special NHS health board with a responsibility to develop and deliver education and training for those people who work in NHS Scotland.

To enable it to fulfil its remit of promoting best practice in the education and lifelong learning of all NHS staff, NES has statutory functions.

NES has a Scotland wide role in undergraduate, postgraduate and continuing professional development and maintains a local perspective through centres in Edinburgh, Glasgow, Dundee, Aberdeen and Inverness.

NES also cooperate and collaborate with regulatory bodies and other organisations that are concerned with the development of the health and care workforce.

Across NHS Scotland, much of the learning that staff undertake is completed in the workplace.

It maintains the Knowledge Network, a service that allows NHS staff to share information. The Knowledge Network also contains educational resources and was a further development of the NHS Scotland e-Library. NES is a member of UKSG, an international association that aims to connect the information community and encourage the exchange of ideas on scholarly communication.

History 

NES was established in April 2002, bringing together three existing bodies - the Scottish Council for Postgraduate Medical and Dental Education, the Post Qualification Education Board for Pharmacists, and the National Board for Nursing, Midwifery and Health Visiting for Scotland.

Since it was formed in 2002, NES has adapted to many changes, working with partner stakeholders to support healthcare professionals and other workers across a range of organisations.

The NES workforce numbers jumped from around 600 people to just over 1000 people in August 2011 as a result of NES taking on the role as employer of GP trainees, when these trainees are on placements in general practice settings.

Working with other organisations 

To develop the health and care workforce, NES have aimed to coordinate their efforts with the regulatory bodies and have developed formal arrangements with some organisations. Since 2006 they have had a memorandum of understanding (MoU) with the General Medical Council and in June 2014 they announced a MoU with the General Pharmaceutical Council. In February 2013 they updated an agreement with the Institute for Research and Innovation in Social Services (IRISS)

References

External links

Education for Scotland, NHS
Education for Scotland, NHS
Education for Scotland, NHS
Medical education in Scotland
Government agencies established in 2002
Organisations based in Edinburgh